Madeleine Fasnacht (born 17 October 1999) is an Australian cyclist, who made the switch from long-distance running and triathlon in mid-2015 to road racing due to medical conditions that hampered her running.

Major Results

2016
1st  National U19 Road Race Championships
2nd   National U19 Time Trial Championships
9th Women's Junior Time Trial,  UCI Road World Championships
2017
1st Time Trial, Commonwealth Youth Games
1st  Junior Time Trial, Oceania Road Championships
1st  National U19 Time Trial Championships
1st  National U19 Road Race Championships
3rd  Junior Time Trial, UCI Road World Championships
3rd  Junior Road Race, Commonwealth Youth Games 
3rd  Junior Time Trial, Oceania Road Championships
4th National U19 Criterium Championships

References

External links
 Madeleine Fasnacht at Pro Cycling Stats

1999 births
Australian female cyclists
Living people